AMMS may refer to:

 Academy of Military Medical Sciences, China
 Advanced Multimedia Supplements